Derek and Keith Brewer, known as the Brewer Twins, are male models.

Biography
The twins were born on September 21, 1973 at Torrance Memorial Hospital in Torrance, California. Derek was born 15 minutes before Keith. Both brothers graduated from California State University, Dominguez Hills, with degrees in Business.

During their modeling career, the twins worked for clients such as GAP, Guess?, Yves Saint Laurent, Lipton, DEKA invest, Boss, Careline, and Armani. They were mentioned in the book Male Super Models, together with names like Markus Schenkenberg and David Fumero. They were ordained two of "The 50 Most Beautiful People in the World" by People magazine in 1998.

They have worked with photographers such as Bruce Weber, Steven Meisel, Tiziano Magni, Claus Wickwrath, Randall Mesdon, Marko Realmonte  and also with model Cindy Crawford. They have appeared on the covers of Glamour, Esquire, Mizz, Sassy, Dolly, Student Life, Vogue, and Fortune., They are also amateur surfers and snowboarders. In 2003 they moved into the insurance business and opened their own insurance agency in 2013 in Redondo Beach, California.

Filmography

See also
Lane Twins
Carlson twins
List of twins

References

External links
 Brewertwins.com
 
 

1973 births
Living people
California State University, Dominguez Hills alumni
People from Torrance, California
Twin models